A ghostwriter is a person who writes under someone else's name with their consent. Celebrities often employ ghostwriters to produce autobiographies.

Ghost Writer, Ghostwriter or Ghostwritten may also refer to:

Films
 The Ghost Writer (film), a 2010 Franco-German-British political thriller film
 Suffering Man's Charity, also called Ghost Writer, a 2007 comedy/horror film directed by Alan Cumming

Literature
 Ghostwriter (book series), a book series based on the American children's mystery television series
 The Ghost Writer, a 1979 novel by the American author Philip Roth

Music
 Ghost Writer (album), the second solo album by Garland Jeffreys
 "Ghostwriter", a tell-all single by rapper Skillz
 "Ghostwriter", the sixth track from RJD2's 2002 album Deadringer
 Ghostwriters (band), an Australian rock band

Television
 Ghost Writer (Hong Kong TV series), a 2010 Hong Kong television series produced by TVB
 Ghost Writer (Japanese TV series), a 2015 Japanese television drama
 Ghostwriter (1992 TV series), a 1992–1995 American children's mystery television series that was broadcast on PBS
 Ghostwriter (2019 TV series), a 2019 American children's mystery television series from Apple TV+ that serves as a reboot to the 1992 series of the same name

Others
 Ghostwriter (hacker group)

See also
 Ghostwritten (novel), the first novel published by English author David Mitchell
 Ghost developer, a development studio that is not credited for a video game
 Ghost producer, a music producer who is not credited for a track